BirdLife Sverige (known as the Swedish Ornithological Society, Sveriges ornitologiska förening, or SOF before 2014) is a Swedish ornithological society founded in 1945 and a BirdLife partner. It currently has 11,000 members, 24 regional branches, and a staff of 24.

The main three goals of the organization are:
 bird conservation;
 to carry out investigation and documentation;
 to promote interest in birds and birdwatching.

BirdLife Sverige develop an electronic, internet-based bird reporting system called Artportalen, used by thousands of Swedish bird watchers to report sightings.

The organization also publishes three magazines: Vår Fågelvärld, Ornis Svecica and Fågelvännen.

References

External links 
 

Ornithological organizations
Ornithological citizen science
1945 establishments in Sweden
Organizations established in 1945
Bird conservation organizations
Animal welfare organizations based in Sweden
BirdLife International